The Las Guijas Mountains are a small northwest–southeast trending mountain range in southern Pima County, Arizona. Surrounding ranges includes the Cerro Colorado Mountains to the northeast, the Tumacacori Mountains of Santa Cruz County to the east, the San Luis Mountains to the south and the Baboquivari Mountains across the Altar Valley to the west. Arivaca is immediately to the southeast and the old mining townsite of Las Guijas is in the wash just north of the range.

Las Guijas Peak at  lies just 4500 feet south of the highest.

Name
The name of the range came from 19th century Spanish miners referring  to las guijas for the rubble as the placer gold they were working occurred in the gravels or conglomerates along the stream valleys and gulches draining the range.

Geology
This tuff was sourced from the Cobre Ridge caldera. Younger Jurassic or Cretaceous sandstone and other sediments occur above the tuff.

The northeastern flank of the range is underlain by an intrusive granite also of Jurassic age.

References

Mountain ranges of Pima County, Arizona
Mountain ranges of Arizona